Murrine (singular: murrina) are colored patterns or images made in a glass cane that are revealed when the cane is cut into thin cross-sections. Murrine can be made in infinite designs from simple circular or square patterns to complex detailed designs to even portraits of people. One familiar style is the flower or star shape which, when used together in large numbers from a number of different canes, is called millefiori. 

Murrine production first appeared in the Middle East more than 4,000 years ago and was revived by Venetian glassmakers on Murano in the early 16th century.

Once murrine have been made, they can be incorporated into a glass vessel or sculpture in several ways.  A number of murrine may be scattered, more or less randomly, on a marver (steel table) and then picked up on the surface of a partially-blown glass bubble.  Further blowing, heating, and shaping on the marver will incorporate the murrine completely into the bubble, creating a random arrangement of murrine in the vessel or sculpture being blown.

Alternatively, the murrine can be arranged in a compact pattern on a ceramic plate and then heated in a furnace until they fuse into a single sheet.  The sheet can be formed over a mold (such as an inverted bowl shape) and further heated so that the murrine are slumped to take the desired form.  

 Another technique using a sheet of murrine made as above is to make a small disc (collar) of molten glass on the end of a blowpipe, and then roll the disc along one edge of the sheet, picking up the sheet on the blowpipe in the form of a cylinder.  The end of the cylinder opposite the blowpipe can be squeezed together and sealed.  With further heating, the sealed cylinder can be blown and formed into any shape a glassblower can make.  

Many notable glass artists regularly use murrine in their work.  These include:
Dante Marioni - American
Richard Marquis - American 
David Patchen - American
Stephen Rolfe Powell - American (D. 2019)
Richard Ritter - American
Kait Rhoads - American
Lino Tagliapietra - Italian
Davide Salvadore - Italian
Giles Bettison - Australian
Stephen Boehme - American
Chelsea Bent/Zach Jorgenson - American
Benjamin Quix (PrecisionPulls) - American
Lucy Bergamini - American
Loren Stump - American 
Antonio Derrossi- Italian
Chris Judeman - American
Khalid Assakr -Egyptian
Karl Taylor - American 
Andy Buckles - American

Examples

See also
Caneworking
Glassblowing
Glass art
Millefiori

References

Glass art
Italian words and phrases